Rila National Park is the largest national park in Bulgaria spanning an area of  in the Rila mountain range in the south-west of the country.

History 
It was established on 24 February 1992 to protect several ecosystems of national importance. There are 120 glacial lakes, including the prominent Seven Rila Lakes. Many rivers have their source in the national park, including the river that carries the most water entirely within the Balkans (the Maritsa river) and the longest river entirely within in Bulgaria (the Iskar river).
 
The national park occupies territory from 4 of the 28 provinces of the country: Sofia, Kyustendil, Blagoevgrad and Pazardzhik. It includes four nature reserves: Parangalitsa, Central Rila Reserve, Ibar and Skakavitsa.

Rila National Park is among the largest and most valuable protected areas in Europe. The International Union for Conservation of Nature  (IUCN) has listed the park as Category II. Two of the four nature reserves are included in the UN list of Representative Protected Areas, and four of the nature reserves are included in the World Network of Biosphere Reserves under the UNESCO Man and Biosphere Programme.

The park falls within the Rodope montane mixed forests terrestrial ecoregion of the Palearctic temperate broadleaf and mixed forest. Forests occupy  or 66% of the total area. There are approximately 1,400 species of vascular plants, 282 species of mosses and 130 species of freshwater algae. The fauna is represented by 48 species of mammals, 99 species of birds, 20 species of reptiles and amphibia and 5 species of fish, as well as 2,934 species of invertebrates, of which 282 are endemic.

External links

 

National parks of Bulgaria
Biosphere reserves of Bulgaria
Rila
Protected areas established in 1992
1992 establishments in Bulgaria
Geography of Blagoevgrad Province
Tourist attractions in Blagoevgrad Province
Geography of Kyustendil Province
Tourist attractions in Kyustendil Province
Geography of Pazardzhik Province
Tourist attractions in Pazardzhik Province
Geography of Sofia Province
Tourist attractions in Sofia Province